The Type 381 (NATO reporting name: Rice Screen) is a 3D G-band air search radar developed by the People's Republic of China. It was the first modern air search radar fitted to a People's Liberation Army Navy warship, the Type 053K frigate Yingtan.

Variants
Type 381A (NATO reporting name: Rice Screen)
Type 381C (NATO reporting name: Rice Shield)

References

Notes

Sources
 
 
 

Sea radars
Military radars of the People's Republic of China